Dominican High School was established by the Adrian Dominican Sisters of the Congregation of the Most Holy Rosary in Detroit, Michigan, United States.

References

High schools in Detroit
Roman Catholic Archdiocese of Detroit
Defunct Catholic secondary schools in Michigan